Alexăndrești is a commune situated in the Rîșcani District of Moldova. It is composed of four villages: Alexăndrești, Cucuieții Noi, Cucuieții Vechi and Ivănești.

References

Communes of Rîșcani District